Mark Thorpe (born 26 March 1969) is a former speedway rider from New Zealand.

Speedway career 
Thorpe is a three times champion of New Zealand, winning the New Zealand Championship in 1993, 1994 and 1996.

He rode in the top tier of British Speedway from 1989 until 1996, riding primarily for the Newcastle Diamonds.

World Final appearances

World Pairs Championship
 1992 -  Lonigo, Pista Speedway (with Mitch Shirra / David Bargh) - 6th - 14pts

References 

1969 births
Living people
New Zealand speedway riders
Newcastle Diamonds riders